Seden is a large village and northeastern suburb of  Odense, in Funen, Denmark. The Suburb has a population of 3.743 It borders Vollsmose to the south and Stige to the north and Kerteminde to the east.

References

Suburbs of Odense
Populated places in Funen